Greenlee Davidson Letcher (July 19, 1867 – August 12, 1954) was an American politician who served in the Virginia House of Delegates. He was the son of Governor John Letcher.

References

External links 

Democratic Party members of the Virginia House of Delegates
19th-century American politicians
People from Lexington, Virginia
Military personnel from Virginia
United States Army officers
United States Army personnel of World War I
1867 births
1954 deaths